David Todd was born in Bristol, Pennsylvania.  He began his career in the music industry at a small retail record store in New York around 1970.

History
Because of his discriminating ear and extensive knowledge of dance music, he was invited to DJ at Fire Island's prestigious Ice Palace in 1971.  David continued to parlay his musical expertise and became the first working DJ to take a promotions and A&R role at a label for RCA Records.

While at RCA, Todd introduced the Latin Hustle to Van McCoy, inspiring McCoy to record "The Hustle." Some of David's remixes for the RCA label include "Shame" by Evelyn "Champagne" King, "Stubborn Kind of Fella" for Buffalo Smoke, and “Keep it Confidential” by former Labelle member, Nona Hendryx.

In the early 80's Todd returned to Philadelphia and served as the resident DJ for The Catacombs.  During that time, David partnered with local DJ turned A&R man Nick Martinelli to form one of Philadelphia's most notable remix and productions teams since Gamble and Huff.    David Todd's contributions to the music industry generated millions of dollars in sales revenue and helped redefine the house music subgenre named "Philly Classics".

Production credits

References

External links 
 Discomusic.com - David Todd Artist Profile Page
 Discogs.com - David Todd Artist Profile Page
 AllMusic.com - Nick Martinelli Biography Page

Year of birth missing (living people)
Living people
People from Bristol, Pennsylvania
American house musicians
American disco musicians